Notre Dame High School opened up in the late 19th century on South Second Street across from St. Joseph's Church in Hamilton, Ohio. The school served as a Catholic high school for young ladies until 1966. The school's students were transferred to the newly opened Father Stephen T. Badin High School.

In 1924 due to increasing enrollment, the school built a new building that replaced two previous buildings on the same site. The building was listed on the National Register of Historic Places in 2001. It has since been refurbished and is currently a senior citizens apartment complex.

See also
Hamilton Catholic High School

References

External links
Badin High School

High schools in Butler County, Ohio
Educational institutions disestablished in 1966
Defunct Catholic secondary schools in Ohio
School buildings on the National Register of Historic Places in Ohio
Buildings and structures in Hamilton, Ohio
National Register of Historic Places in Butler County, Ohio